Kanhpuria or Kanhvanshi is a Dynasty of KSHATRIYA. Maharaja Kanh (Kanhdev) was the originator of this dynasty, whose empire was spread over the districts of Awadh and established the capital of his empire by establishing Kanhpur on the banks of the Sai river in Rae Bareli district, and another kanpur was established on the banks of Ganga River by Maharaja Kanhdev in around 1217 , which is the major city of Uttar Pradesh, which is the impaired name of Kanhpur.

History

The name of this Kshatriya dynasty is called Kanhpuria (Kanhvanshi) due to the name of Maharaja Kanh and residing in this Kanhpur.

Originally Kanhpuria dynasty is a branch of Chandravansh.

In the 12th century Jhunsi, Allahabad (now Prayagraj) which was the stronghold of the Chandravanshi Kshatriyas, from this Jhunsi, the Chandravanshi Kshatriya king was Karnadev, who was the commander in the army of King Jaychand Gaharwar of Kannauj. King Karnadev was married to Bhagwant kunwari Gaharwar (Bindumati), the daughter of King Manikchand, brother of King Jaychand.

King Karnadev fought fiercely with Muhammad Ghori and Qutubuddin Aibak in which the enemy commander Abdul Rahim was killed by king Karnadev but later King Karnadev was also martyred in battle,

When King Karnadev was martyred, his wife or King Manik Chand's daughter Bhagwant kunwari Gaharwar was pregnant, to protect her, King Manikchand took her daughter to the Gogaso Ashram (in Rae Bareli district) of Rishi Sukshma Muni ji and the same " Maharaja Kanhdev "(Raja Kanh) was born,
Maharaja Kanhdev was the heroic son of King Karnadev and Bhagwant Kunwari Gaharwar and King Manikchand was his maternal grandfather

When Maharaja Kanhdev was young, Rishu Sukshma Muni ji blessed him to be the originator of the new Kshatriya dynasty "Kanhpuria dynasty" and  While giving blessings, Rishi Sukshma Muni Ji said that you spread your empire in 7 days, you will be victorious

Maharaja Kanhdev established his empire in an area of more than 14 parganas in the districts of Awadh, whose capital was Kanhapur, near the Sai River. and Another kanpur was established on the banks of Ganga River by Maharaja Kanh, which is Major City of Uttar Pradesh, which is the impaired name of kanhpur

Maharaja Kanhdev first married the daughter of the Visen Kshatriya king of Majhauli (Deoria), and the second married the daughter of the Trilokchandi Bais Kshatriya king of Hajipur (Bihar).

Maharaja Kanhdev had three sons, the eldest son Maharaja Sahas who established the state of Kathola (in Pratapgad district) and his later descendants established Nayan State and Nuruddinpur (Karahiya) State.

The second son Maharaja Rahas expanded his empire in the Gaura Katari region. Further descendants of Maharaja Rahas established all these states, Katari State, Dakhinwara State, Tiloi State, Shahamau State, Tekari State, Chandapur State, Semrauta State, Atheha State, Rajapur State, Umrar State, Bhuwanshahpur State, Hargaon State, Jamon State, Barauliya State, Resi State.

The third son of Maharaja Kanhdev was Raja Udaan who got a darra area (in Pratapgarh district) in succession.

The area spread over 14 parganas or 40 kos ruled by Kanhapurias is called " Kanhapuria Taluk or Kanhapuria Garh " by the people.

References

Further reading
 M. K. A. Siddiqui (ed.), Marginal Muslim Communities in India, Institute of Objective Studies, New Delhi (2004)
 Dasharatha Sharma Rajasthan through the Ages a comprehensive and authentic history of Rajasthan, prepared under the orders of the Government of Rajasthan. First published 1966 by Rajasthan Archives.

External links
 Rajputs Columbia Encyclopedia, Sixth Edition; 2005

Rajput clans of Uttar Pradesh